Chittaranjan College, established in 1967, is an undergraduate college in Kolkata, West Bengal, India. It is affiliated with the University of Calcutta.

Departments

Arts and Commerce
Education
Bengali
English
Hindi
History
Political Science
Philosophy
Commerce

Accreditation
Chittaranjan College is recognized by the University Grants Commission (UGC).

See also 
List of colleges affiliated to the University of Calcutta
Education in India
Education in West Bengal

References

External links
 Chittaranjan College

Educational institutions established in 1967
University of Calcutta affiliates
Universities and colleges in Kolkata
1967 establishments in West Bengal